Hadja Andrée Touré was the first to gain the title of First Lady of the Republic of Guinea as the wife of Ahmed Sékou Touré, the country's first president when it gained independence in October 1958. She retained the title until her husband died in March 1984. She and her son were then arrested and in 1987 she was sentenced to eight years of forced labour. She was able to leave the country but returned in 2000.

Biography
Born in 1931 in Kankan, Andrée Touré is the daughter of the French physician Paul-Marie Duplantier and Kaïssa Kourouma, a Maninka.  After her father left the country at the outbreak of the Second World War, Andrée was raised by the family of her uncle, Mory Sinkoun Kaba. Shortly after completing her schooling with the primary school certificate, she met her husband to be, Sékou Touré. The couple were married on 18 June 1953 at the Mosque of Kankan, although in accordance with Muslim rites, they did not attend the ceremony. On 12 March 1961, their son Mohamed was born.

When Guinea gained independence in October 1958 and Sékou Touré became president, Andrée performed her role as First Lady with exemplary support for her husband. She was always at his side at key meetings with world leaders, including John F. Kennedy, in Washington, Habib Bourguiba in Tunis, Mao Zedong in Beijing and Nikita Khrushchev in Moscow.

After her husband died following an unsuccessful heart operation on 26 March 1984, Andrée Touré was arrested and her property confiscated. In 1987, she was sentenced to eight years of forced labour but was released in January 1988 and allowed to leave the country. After living in Morocco, the Ivory Coast and Senegal, she returned to Guinea in 2000. She has since constantly spoken of her husband's success in establishing and developing the independent state. Her son Mohamed Touré has been appointed secretary-general of the party founded by his father, the Democratic Party of Guinea.

References

First ladies of Guinea
Grand Crosses 1st class of the Order of Merit of the Federal Republic of Germany
People from Kankan
Living people
Year of birth missing (living people)